John Alexander Elphinstone, 17th Lord Elphinstone and 3rd Baron Elphinstone  (22 March 1914 – 15 November 1975) was a British nobleman and serviceman during World War II. He was a first cousin of Queen Elizabeth II.

Early life
Elphinstone was born on 22 March 1914.  He was a son of Sidney Buller-Fullerton-Elphinstone, 16th Lord Elphinstone, and Lady Mary Bowes-Lyon.  Among his siblings was the Rev. Hon. Andrew Charles Victor Elphinstone (the aide-de-camp to the Viceroy of India from 1941 to 1943) and the Hon. Margaret Elphinstone, wife of writer Denys Rhodes. His father was an avid hunter who in 1903 shot the "largest moose ever killed in Alaska."

His paternal grandparents were William Elphinstone, 15th Lord Elphinstone (the 1st Baron Elphinstone) and the former Lady Constance Euphemia Woronzow Murray (second daughter of Alexander Murray, 6th Earl of Dunmore).  His maternal grandparents were Claude Bowes-Lyon, 14th Earl of Strathmore and Kinghorne and the former Nina Cecilia Cavendish-Bentinck (eldest surviving daughter and co-heiress of Rev. Charles Cavendish-Bentinck, a grandson of the 3rd Duke of Portland). He was a nephew of Queen Elizabeth The Queen Mother and a first cousin of Queen Elizabeth II and Princess Margaret, Countess of Snowdon.

Career
During World War II, he became a captain in the Scottish Black Watch and was later made a lieutenant with the Royal Company of Archers.  While in service, he became a prisoner of war, and was one of the "prominente" held in Oflag IV-C (Colditz Castle); as a nephew of King George VI he was considered a potential bargaining chip by the Nazis.

Lord Elphinstone served as president of the Scottish Association of Boys' Clubs, chairman of council of the Scottish branch of British Red Cross Society, and president of the Royal Zoological Society of Scotland.  He also served as a director of the Bank of Scotland and the Scottish Provident Institute.

Personal life
In 1970, during Manitoba's centennial, he was invited by the community of Elphinstone and gave a silver map case, which is today located at the Elphinstone post office, all named in his family's honor.

As he died unmarried and without issue, he was succeeded in his titles by his nephew James.

Ancestry

References 

1914 births
1975 deaths
English people of Dutch descent
Elphinstone
Barons in the Peerage of the United Kingdom
Deputy Lieutenants of Angus
De Peyster family
Schuyler family
Van Cortlandt family
John
Members of the Royal Company of Archers
17
Eldest sons of British hereditary barons